Frederic Bayco, sometimes spelt Fredric Bayco (1913 – 1970) was an English organist and composer of light music, best known for his Tudor pastiche "Elizabethan Masque". Born in London, he attended Brighton School of Music, where he attained an ARCO. He was later made a fellow of the Royal College of Organists (FRCO). After war service in the Royal Air Force he became organist and director of music at Holy Trinity Church, Paddington, and also taught organ and musical appreciation at St Gabriel's College, London.

The Elizabethan Masque, a piece looking back on the ceremony and etiquette of the first Elizabethan era in the early years of the second, was composed in 1957. Other pieces that became well known include "Lady Beautiful", and his marches "Royal Windsor" and "Marche Militaire".

Like many composers of the light music genre, he contributed a number of pieces to music libraries, and as a result his pieces "Inferno" and "Finger of Fear" have ended up being frequently used in programmes such as Count Duckula, The Ren & Stimpy Show and SpongeBob SquarePants. Many of his KPM library compositions have a historical or martial feel, for example the mock-heroic "Joust" Other pieces appear to have unusual titles, for example "Bear in a Buggy".

References

Light music composers
1913 births
1970 deaths
20th-century classical musicians
20th-century English composers